Dianthus cyprius is a shrubby hairless perennial plant with overarching branches up to 90 cm long, the flowering branches growing from the sides of stems end in leaf-tufts. The Calyx-tube grows up to 2.5 cm cylindrical, with 4-9 pairs of bracts at the base. Flowers clustered, 2 cm in diameter; petals pink with some red marking toward the centre. Flowers from June to November. The plant's common name is "Dianthos o Kyprios".

Distribution
Endemic to Cyprus where it is frequent on high limestone cliff faces along the Northern Range, Kornos, St Hilarion, around Halevka and on Kantara Castle walls.

References

cyprius
Endemic flora of Cyprus